Balli Durga Prasad Rao (15 June 1956 – 16 September 2020) was an Indian politician.

Biography
He was elected to the Lok Sabha, lower house of the Parliament of India from Tirupati, Andhra Pradesh in the 2019 Indian general election as a member of the YSR Congress Party.

Balli Durga Prasad Rao was elected as MLA from Gudur Assembly constituency, Andhra Pradesh. He served as MLA from 1985 to 1989, 1994–1999, 1999-2004 & 2009-2014 (4 terms). He also served as Minister for Primary Education from 1996 to 1998 in the NTR government. He became MLA at the age of 28 years. He served as Member of PAC, Andhra Pradesh (2009-2014).
 He joined YSRCP in 2019.

In September 2020, Prasad Rao tested positive for COVID-19 during the COVID-19 pandemic in India and he was hospitalized at a hospital in Chennai. He suffered cardiac arrest on 16 September and was pronounced dead.

In 2021, his son, Balli Kalyanachakravarthy, was elected to the Andhra Pradesh Legislative Council.

References

External links
 Official biographical sketch in Parliament of India website

|-

External links
 Official biographical sketch in Parliament of India website

2020 deaths
India MPs 2019–present
Deaths from the COVID-19 pandemic in India
Lok Sabha members from Andhra Pradesh
YSR Congress Party politicians
1956 births
People from Tirupati
Andhra Pradesh MLAs 1985–1989
Andhra Pradesh MLAs 1994–1999
Andhra Pradesh MLAs 1999–2004
Andhra Pradesh MLAs 2009–2014
Telugu Desam Party politicians